Apotoforma mayumbeana is a species of moth of the family Tortricidae that is endemic to the Democratic Republic of the Congo.

The ground colour of the forewings is cream with slight brownish admixture, brownish strigulae and brown dots. The base of the costa is grey. The hindwings are pale brownish.

Etymology
The species name refers to the type locality.

References

External links

Moths described in 2012
Tortricini
Insects of the Democratic Republic of the Congo
Moths of Africa
Taxa named by Józef Razowski
Endemic fauna of the Democratic Republic of the Congo